Corporal August Kauss (or Kautz) (November 6, 1843 – April 27, 1913) was an American soldier who fought in the American Civil War. Kauss received his country's highest award for bravery during combat, the Medal of Honor. Kauss's medal was won for capturing a flag at the Battle of Five Forks in Virginia on April 1, 1865. He was honored with the award on May 10, 1865.

Kauss was born in Germany. He joined the 8th New York Infantry from New York City in April 1861, and mustered out with this regiment after two years. He re-enlisted with the 15th New York Heavy Artillery in August 1863, and again mustered out with his regiment after two years. Kauss was buried in Hurley, New York.

Medal of Honor citation

See also
List of American Civil War Medal of Honor recipients: G–L

References

1843 births
1913 deaths
American Civil War recipients of the Medal of Honor
German-born Medal of Honor recipients
German emigrants to the United States
People of New York (state) in the American Civil War
Union Army officers
United States Army Medal of Honor recipients
People from Hurley, New York